Surendra Kumar Singh (14 September 1932 – 14 June 2015) was a scion of princely state of Raigarh and politician.

He was second son of Raja Chakradhar Singh and younger brother of Raja Lalit Kumar Singh.

He was educated at Rajkumar College, Raipur, Mayo College, Ajmer and St. Xavier's College, Bombay.

He was politician of Indian National Congress and was elected as a member of the Madhya Pradesh Legislative Assembly 1962-1967 and 1972-1990 from Lailunga (now part of Chhattisgarh). He was a member of the Committee on Defence, 1996–97 and Committee on Petroleum and Natural Gas and Consultative Committee for the Ministry of Planning and Programme Implementation, Science and Technology and other Science Departments 1996/97. Later he served as a Member of the Rajya Sabha from 1996 to 2002.

He died on 14 June 2015 at Indore after sudden complaint of chest pain and breathlessness.

References

1932 births
2015 deaths
Madhya Pradesh MLAs 1962–1967
Indian National Congress politicians from Madhya Pradesh
Indian National Congress politicians from Chhattisgarh
Madhya Pradesh MLAs 1972–1977
Madhya Pradesh MLAs 1977–1980
Madhya Pradesh MLAs 1980–1985
Madhya Pradesh MLAs 1985–1990
Rajya Sabha members from Madhya Pradesh
Indian royalty
People from Raigarh
Mayo College alumni
St. Xavier's College, Mumbai alumni
Rajas of Raigarh
Rajya Sabha members from Chhattisgarh